The women's long jump at the 2019 World Para Athletics Championships was held at the Dubai Club for People with Determination in Dubai from 7–15 November.

Medalists

Detailed results

T11

T12

T20

T37

T38

T47

T63

T64

See also
List of IPC world records in athletics

References

long jump
2019 in women's athletics
Long jump at the World Para Athletics Championships